Okongwu is a surname of Nigerian origin. Notable people with the surname include:

Chu Okongwu (1934–2022), Nigerian economist and politician
Onyeka Okongwu (born 2000), American basketball player

Surnames of Nigerian origin